This list of the Paleozoic life of California contains the various prehistoric life-forms whose fossilized remains have been reported from within the US state of California and are between 538.8 and 252.17 million years of age.

A

 †Acanthopecten
 †Acidiphorus
 †Acidiphorus hesperia
 †Advenella
 †Advenella bifurcata
 †Agathiceras
 †Alaskospira
 †Alaskospira dunbari – or unidentified comparable form
 †Albertella
 †Albertella longwelli
 †Alitaria – tentative report
 †Allosaccus – tentative report
 †Alokistocare
 †Alokistocarella
 †Alokistocarella brighamensis – or unidentified comparable form
 †Amblysiphonella
 †Amblysiphonella grossa
 †Amblysiphonelloides
 †Amblysiphonelloides reticulata
 †Amblysiphonelloides tubulara
 †Ambocoelia – tentative report
 †Amecephalus
 †Amecephalus arrojosensis
 †Ampyx – tentative report
 †Ampyx
 †Ampyx compactus
 †Anidanthus
 †Anidanthus shastensis – type locality for species
 †Annuliconcha
 †Anomalorthis
 †Anoptambonites
 †Anoptambonites myiomorpheus – type locality for species
 †Anoptambonites myriomorpheus
 †Antiquatonia
 †Apatolichas
 †Arceodomus
 †Arceodomus langenheimi – type locality for species
 †Archaeoscyphia
 †Archaeoscyphia mazourkaensis – type locality for species
 †Arcullina
 †Arcullina polaris – or unidentified related form
 †Arcuolenellus
 †Arcuolenellus megafrontalis – or unidentified comparable form
    †Aspidella – tentative report
 †Aspidella terranovica
 †Astartella
  †Atrypa
 †Atrypa reticularis
 †Atrypella
 †Atrypella tenuis – or unidentified comparable form
 †Atrypoidea – tentative report
 †Aulophyllum – tentative report
 †Austinella
 †Austinella kankakensis – or unidentified related form
 †Austinella kankakesis – or unidentified related form
  †Aviculopecten
 †Aviculopecten dissimilis
 †Aviculopecten fimbriatus
 †Aviculopecten occidentalis – or unidentified comparable form

B

 †Bakevellia
 †Bathymyonia
 †Bathymyonia nevadensis – or unidentified comparable form
 †Bayhaium
 †Bayhaium merriamorum
 †Bayhaium virginiae – type locality for species
 †Bellefontia
 †Beraunia
 †Beraunia bifrons – or unidentified comparable form
 †Bicarina
 †Bicarina petilitornata
 †Biformispira – type locality for genus
 †Biformispira isaacsoni – type locality for species
 †Bighornia
 †Bimuria
 †Blastoidocrinus
 †Blastoidocrinus carchariaedens – or unidentified comparable form
 †Bolbolenellus
 †Bolbolenellus brevispinus
 †Bolbolenellus euryparia
 †Bonnia
 †Boucotspira – type locality for genus
 †Boucotspira fimbriata – type locality for species
 †Brachyprion
 †Brachyprion seretensis – or unidentified comparable form
   †Bristolia
 †Bristolia anteros
 †Bristolia brachyomma
 †Bristolia bristolensis
 †Bristolia fragilis
 †Bristolia insolens
 †Bristolia mohavensis
 †Bryorhynchus – report made of unidentified related form or using admittedly obsolete nomenclature
 †Bryorhynchus bisulcatum
  †Bumastus
 †Buxtonia
 †Buxtonia scabriculoides
 †Buxtonia websteri – or unidentified comparable form

C

 †Calycocoelia
 †Calycocoelia typicalis – type locality for species
  †Calymene
 †Camarotoechia – tentative report
 †Cancrinella
 †Cancrinella phosphatica
 †Cancrinella undata
 †Carolinites
 †Carolinites genacinaca
 †Carolinites sibiricus
 †Chalaroschwagerina
 †Chalaroschwagerina inflata – type locality for species
 †Chalaroschwagerina obesa – type locality for species
 †Chalaroschwagerina pulchra – type locality for species
 †Chalaroschwagerina tumentis – type locality for species
 †Cheilocephalus
 †Chonetes
 †Chonetinella
 †Choristitella
 †Cladopora
 †Clavicosta – tentative report
  †Cleiothyridina
 †Clelandia
 †Clelandia aspina
 †Clelandia bispina
 †Cliefdenella
 †Cliefdenella alaskaensis
 †Clisiophyllum
 †Clisiophyllum gabbi
 †Clisiophyllum oweni – type locality for species
  †Composita
 †Composita grandis – or unidentified comparable form
 †Composita subtilita – or unidentified comparable form
 †Conchidium
 †Conchidium biloculare – or unidentified comparable form
 †Conocardium
 †Cordillerastraea
 †Cordillerastraea inyoensis – type locality for species
 †Cornwallatia
 †Cornwallatia tabularia
 †Corymbospongia
 †Corymbospongia adnata
 †Corymbospongia mica
 †Corymbospongia perforata
 †Costispinifera – report made of unidentified related form or using admittedly obsolete nomenclature
 †Costispinifera costata – tentative report
 †Crenulosepta
 †Crenulosepta delicata – type locality for species
 †Crenulosepta fusiformis – type locality for species
 †Crenulosepta inyoensis – type locality for species
 †Crenulosepta rossi – type locality for species
 †Crenulosepta wahlmani – type locality for species
 †Crurithyris
   †Cruziana
 †Cuniculinella
 †Cuniculinella acuta – type locality for species
 †Cuniculinella ampla – type locality for species
 †Cuniculinella calx
 †Cuniculinella extensa – type locality for species
 †Cuniculinella fusiformis – type locality for species
 †Cuniculinella mojavensis – type locality for species
 †Cuniculinella munda – type locality for species
 †Cuniculinella parva – type locality for species
 †Cuniculinella solita – type locality for species
 †Cuniculinella tumida – type locality for species
 †Cuniculinella ventricosa – type locality for species
 †Cyathactis
 †Cyathactis gazellensis – type locality for species
 †Cybelurus
  †Cyclolobus
 †Cyclolobus walkeri
 †Cyclonema
 †Cyclonema bilix – or unidentified comparable form
 †Cymbidium
 †Cyrtina
 †Cystiphyllum
 †Cystothalamiella
 †Cystothalamiella craticula
 †Cystothalamiella ducta
 †Cystothalamiella tuboides

D

  †Daguinaspis
 †Dalejina
 †Dalmanella
 †Dalmanophyllum
 †Dalmanophyllum dalmani – or unidentified comparable form
 †Darwasophyllum – tentative report
 †Deacheospira
 †Deacheospira hotzi – type locality for species
 †Deltopecten – tentative report
 †Derbyia
 †Diacanthaspis
 †Dicellograptus
 †Dicoelosia
 †Dicoelosia conspicua – or unidentified related form
 †Dicoelosia jonesridgenesis
 †Dicoelosia jonesridgensis
 †Dictyoclostus – report made of unidentified related form or using admittedly obsolete nomenclature
  †Didymograptus
 †Didymograptus protobifidus
 †Dimeropygiella
 †Dimeropygiella caudanodosa
 †Diochthofera
 †Diochthofera conspicua
 †Diplanus
 †Diplanus stanleyi
  †Diplichnites
 †Discomyorthis
 †Discotropis – tentative report
 †Dolerorthis
 †Donaldiella
 †Donaldiella derwiduii – or unidentified comparable form
 †Dorsoscyphus
 †Dorsoscyphus johnsoni
 †Durhamina
 †Durhamina kenneyi – type locality for species
 †Dyticospirifer

E

 †Eccyliopterus
 †Eccyliopterus regularis – or unidentified related form
 †Echinauris
 †Echinauris subhorrida
 †Echinoconchus
 †Echinoconchus punctatus
 †Ectenonotus
 †Ectenonotus raymondi – or unidentified comparable form
 †Ectenonotus westoni – or unidentified comparable form
 †Ectenonotus whittingtoni
 †Ectomaria
 †Ectomaria callahanensis – type locality for species
 †Ectomaria prisca
 †Elasmothyris
 †Elasmothyris limata – type locality for species
  †Encrinurus
   †Endoceras – tentative report
 †Enigmalites
 †Enigmalites roberti – type locality for species
 †Eofletcheria
 †Eomarginifera
 †Eoparafusulina
 †Eoparafusulina alta – type locality for species
 †Eoparafusulina brevis – type locality for species
 †Eoparafusulina certa – type locality for species
 †Eoparafusulina contracta – type locality for species
 †Eoparafusulina cylindrica – type locality for species
 †Eoparafusulina depressa – type locality for species
 †Eoparafusulina gracilis
 †Eoparafusulina linearis
 †Eoparafusulina minuta – type locality for species
 †Eoparafusulina modica – type locality for species
 †Eoparafusulina nitida – type locality for species
 †Eoparafusulina ovata – type locality for species
 †Eoparafusulina parva – type locality for species
 †Eoparafusulina potterensis – type locality for species
 †Eoparafusulina proba – type locality for species
 †Eoparafusulina regularis – type locality for species
 †Eoparafusulina rotunda – type locality for species
 †Eoparafusulina spissa – type locality for species
 †Eoparafusulina tarda – type locality for species
 †Eoparafusulina tenuitheca – type locality for species
 †Eoparafusulina thompsoni
 †Eotomaria
 †Eotomaria perryi – type locality for species
 †Epitomyonia
 †Epitomyonia recilina
 †Epitomyonia relicina
 †Eridmatus
 †Eridmatus texanus – or unidentified comparable form
 †Eridorthis
 †Eripnifera – type locality for genus
 †Eripnifera praecipitis – type locality for species
 †Etheripecten
 †Euconospira
 †Eunema
 †Eunema strigillatum – or unidentified comparable form
 †Euomphalopterus – tentative report
  †Euomphalus
 †Eurogrewingkia
 †Eurogrewingkia penobscotensis
 †Eusphairica – type locality for genus
 †Eusphairica distubula – type locality for species

F

  †Fallotaspis
 †Favosites
 †Fenestella
 †Fieldaspis
 †Fluctuaria
 †Fomichevella
 †Fomichevella major – or unidentified comparable form
 †Fomichevella nevadensis

G

 †Gallatinospongia
 †Gallatinospongia conica
 †Girtyocoelia
 †Girtyocoelia epiporata
 †Girtyocoelia tubula
 †Glassia – tentative report
 †Globonema
 †Globonema niota – or unidentified comparable form
 †Glossopleura
 †Glossopleura lodensis
 †Glossopleura walcotti
 †Glyptorthis
  †Gogia
 †Gogia ojenai – type locality for species
 †Goniostropha
 †Goniostropha bachelieri – or unidentified comparable form
 †Gshelia
 †Gshelia americana – type locality for species
 †Gypidula

H

  †Halysites
 †Heintzella
 †Heintzella applegatei – type locality for species
 †Heintzella playfordi
 †Helicoplacus
 †Helicoplacus gilberti
  †Helicoprion
 †Helicoprion davisii
 †Helicotoma
 †Helicotoma griffinorum – type locality for species
 †Heliolites
 †Heliomeroides
 †Hercynella
 †Hercynella bohemica – or unidentified comparable form
 †Heritschiella
 †Heritschiella girtyi
 †Heritschioides
 †Heritschioides carneyi – type locality for species
 †Heritschioides hammani – type locality for species
 †Heritschioides wexoi – type locality for species
 †Hesperocoelia
 †Hesperocoelia undulata
 †Hesperorthis
 †Hesperorthis dubia – or unidentified comparable form
 †Hesperorthis evenkiensis
 †Heterocaninia
 †Heterocaninia langenheimi – type locality for species
  †Holopea
 †Holopea brucei – type locality for species
 †Holopea elizabethi – type locality for species
 †Holopea glindmeyeri – type locality for species
 †Holopea symmetrica – or unidentified comparable form
 †Hormotoma
 †Howellella
 †Howellella smithi – or unidentified comparable form
 †Hustedia
 †Hustedia compressa
 †Hyalostelia
  †Hyolithes
 †Hystricurus

I

  †Illaenus
 †Imperatoria
 †Imperatoria irregularis
 †Imperatoria media
 †Imperatoria mega
 †Imperatoria minima
 †Ingria
 †Inyoschwagerina
 †Inyoschwagerina elayeri – type locality for species
 †Inyoschwagerina elongata – type locality for species
 †Inyoschwagerina inflata – type locality for species
 †Inyoschwagerina linderae – type locality for species
 †Inyoschwagerina magnifica – type locality for species
 †Inyoschwagerina mira – type locality for species
 †Inyoschwagerina rotunda – type locality for species
 †Inyoschwagerina turgida
 †Ischyrotoma
 †Iskutella
 †Iskutella fergusoni – type locality for species
 †Isogramma
 †Isogramma pachti
 †Isorthis – tentative report
  †Isotelus
 †Isotelus spurius

K

 †Kabyaipecten
 †Karavankina
 †Kawina
 †Kawina scrobiculus
 †Kirkirhynchus
 †Kirkirhynchus reesidei – or unidentified comparable form
 †Kitakamithyris
 †Klamathastraea – type locality for genus
 †Klamathastraea dilleri – type locality for species
 †Klamathina
 †Klamathina elongata – type locality for species
 †Klamathina simplex – type locality for species
 †Klamathina singularis – type locality for species
 †Kleopatrina – type locality for genus
 †Kleopatrina mccloudensis – type locality for species
 †Kleopatrina raubae – type locality for species
 †Komiella
 †Komiella ostiolata – or unidentified comparable form
 †Krotovia
  †Kutorgina
 †Kyphophyllum
 †Kyphophyllum greggi – type locality for species

L

 †Langenheimia – type locality for genus
 †Langenheimia klamathensis – type locality for species
 †Laticrura
 †Laticrura erecta – or unidentified related form
 †Leioclema – tentative report
 †Leperditia
 †Leperditia bivia
 †Leptellina
 †Leptodus
 †Leptodus nobilis – or unidentified related form
 †Leptostrophia – tentative report
 †Leptotriticites
 †Leptotriticites americanus – or unidentified related form
 †Leptotriticites californicus
 †Leptotriticites glenensis
 †Leptotriticites gracilitatus – or unidentified comparable form
 †Leptotriticites hatchetensis – or unidentified related form
 †Leptotriticites hughesensis – or unidentified comparable form
 †Leptotriticites koschmanni – or unidentified comparable form
 †Leptotriticites panamintensis – type locality for species
 †Leptotriticites varius – or unidentified comparable form
 †Leptotriticites warmspringensis – type locality for species
 †Leptotriticites wetherensis
  †Lingula
  †Lingulella
 †Linoproductus
 †Linoproductus nasutus – tentative report
 †Linsleyella – type locality for genus
 †Linsleyella greggi – type locality for species
 †Linsleyella johnsoni – type locality for species
 †Liosotella
 †Liosotella cooperi – type locality for species
 †Liospira
 †Liospira modesta
 †Lissocoelia
 †Lissocoelia ramosa
 †Lissomarginifera
 †Lissomarginifera shastensis
 †Lithostrotion
 †Lithostrotion pauciradiale
   †Lonchodomas
 †Lophospira
 †Lophospira milleri – or unidentified comparable form
 †Lophospira perangulata
 †Loxonema – tentative report
 †Lytvophyllum – tentative report

M

 †Maclurites
 †Maclurites crassa – or unidentified related form
 †Maclurites klamathensis – type locality for species
 †Malpaisia – type locality for genus
 †Malpaisia maceyi – type locality for species
 †Meekella
 †Megakozlowskiella
 †Megalomphala – tentative report
 †Megalomphala contorta
  †Meristella
 †Meristella robertsensis – or unidentified comparable form
 †Mesocoelia
 †Mesocoelia janus – or unidentified comparable form
 †Mesodouvillina – tentative report
 †Mestoronema
 †Mestoronema marginalis – or unidentified comparable form
 †Mexicaspis
 †Mexicaspis radiatus
 †Mexicella
 †Mexicella grandoculus
 †Mexicella mexicana
 †Mexicella robusta
 †Mexicella stator – tentative report
 †Michelinia
 †Michelinia nelsoni – type locality for species
 †Micromitra
 †Microryctocara
 †Microryctocara nevadensis
 †Monocraterion
 †Monodiexodina – tentative report
 †Mooreoceras
 †Mucophyllum
 †Mucophyllum mcintyrei – or unidentified comparable form
 †Murchisonia
 †Murchisonia bilineata – or unidentified comparable form

N

 †Neilsonia
 †Neochonetes
 †Neochonetes pseudoliratus – or unidentified related form
 †Neomultithecopora
 †Neomultithecopora mccutcheonae
 †Neomultithecopora providensis – type locality for species
 †Neomultithecopora sandoi – type locality for species
  †Neospirifer
 †Neosyringopora
 †Neosyringopora multattenuata
  †Nephrolenellus
 †Nephrolenellus multinodus
 †Nevadatubuls
 †Nevadatubuls dunfee
 †Nevadatubulus
 †Nevadatubulus dunfee
  †Nevadella
 †Nigribaccinus
 †Nigribaccinus elegans – type locality for species
 †Nigribaccinus giganteus – type locality for species
 †Nigribaccinus nestelli – type locality for species
 †Nileus
 †Nileus hesperaffinis
 †Nucleospira
 †Nucleospira ventricosa – or unidentified comparable form
 †Nuculavus
 †Nuculites
 †Nyella
 †Nyella clinolimbata – tentative report

O

  †Obolella
 †OIenellus
 †OIenellus gilberti
    †Olenellus
 †Olenellus arcuatus
 †Olenellus clarki
 †Olenellus cylindricus
 †Olenellus euryparia
 †Olenellus fowleri – or unidentified comparable form
 †Olenellus frementi
 †Olenellus fremonti
 †Olenellus gilberti
 †Olenellus howelli
 †Olenellus multinodus
 †Olenellus nevadensis
 †Olenellus puertoblancoensis
 †Olenellus terminatus
 †Olenellus transifans – or unidentified comparable form
 †Olenellus transiftans – or unidentified comparable form
 †Olenellus transitans – or unidentified comparable form
 †Olenellus turmalis – or unidentified comparable form
 †Omphalotrochus
 †Omphalotrochus whitneyi – type locality for species
 †Onchocephalites
 †Onchocephalites claytonensis – type locality for species
 †Onchocephalites laevis
 †Ophiletina
 †Ophiletina sublaxa – or unidentified related form
 †Orbiculoidea
 †Orbiculoidea damanensis
 †Orthambonites
 †Orthambonites decipiens
 †Orthambonites eucharis
 †Orthambonites mazousbensis
 †Orthambonites minisculus
 †Orthambonites minusculus
 †Orthambonites patulus
 †Orthidiella
 †Orthidiella extensa
 †Orthophyllum – tentative report
 †Orthotetes
 †Orthotichia
 †Orthotichia nawtawaketensis
 †Oryctocephalites
 †Oryctocephalites resseri
 †Oryctocephalus
 †Oryctocephalus indicus
 †Oryctocephalus nyensis
 †Oryctocephalus orientalis
 †Ovatia

P

 †Pachystrophia – tentative report
 †Pachystrophia devexa – or unidentified comparable form
 †Pacificocoelia
 †Paladin
 Palaeoaplysina
 †Palaeomphalus
 †Palaeomphalus olsoni – type locality for species
 †Palaeophycus
 †Palaeophyllum
 †Paleochiton
 †Paleochiton siskiyouensis – type locality for species
 †Palliseria
 †Paraantagmus
 †Paraantagmus latus
 †Parafusulina
 †Parafusulina bakeri – or unidentified comparable form
 †Parafusulina californica
 †Parafusulina cerrogordoensis – type locality for species
 †Parafusulina complexa – type locality for species
 †Parafusulina durhami – or unidentified related form
 †Parafusulina halli – type locality for species
 †Parafusulina juncea – type locality for species
 †Parafusulina klamathensis – type locality for species
 †Parafusulina maleyi
 †Parafusulina mccloudensis – type locality for species
 †Parafusulina nosonensis
 †Parafusulina owensensis – type locality for species
 †Parafusulina potterensis – type locality for species
 †Parafusulina shaksgamensis – or unidentified comparable form
 †Parafusulina splendens
 †Parafusulina ubehebensis – type locality for species
 †Parafusulina virga
 †Paraheritschioides
 †Paraheritschioides californiense – or unidentified related form
 †Paraheritschioides stevensi – type locality for species
 †Paralbertella
 †Paralenorthis
 †Paralenorthis marshalli
 †Paralenorthis parcicrassicostatus – or unidentified comparable form
 †Paralenorthis parvicrassicostata – or unidentified comparable form
 †Paralenorthis parvicrassicostatus – or unidentified comparable form
 †Paraliospira – type locality for genus
 †Paraliospira angulata
 †Paraliospira gradata – type locality for species
 †Paraliospira helena
 †Paraliospira mundula
 †Paraliospira planata – type locality for species
 †Parallelodon
 †Parallelodon cingulatus
 †Parallelodon qinghaiensis
 †Parallelodon verneuilianus
 †Paramesolobus – tentative report
 †Paramesolobus sinuosus – or unidentified comparable form
 †Pararachnastraea
 †Pararachnastraea bellula – type locality for species
 †Pararachnastraea delicata – type locality for species
 †Pararachnastraea mckibbinae – type locality for species
 †Pararachnastraea owensensis – type locality for species
 †Pararachnastraea peggyae – type locality for species
 †Pararachnastraea wilsoni – type locality for species
 †Paraschwagerina
 †Paraschwagerina crassitheca – type locality for species
 †Paraschwagerina elongata – type locality for species
 †Paraschwagerina fairbanksi – type locality for species
 †Paraschwagerina fax
 †Paraschwagerina magna – type locality for species
 †Paraschwagerina tarda – type locality for species
 †Patellispongia
 †Patellispongia oculata – or unidentified comparable form
 †Patriaspirifer
 †Patriaspirifer kobehana
 †Paupospira
 †Paupospira sumnerensis – or unidentified related form
 †Paurorthis
  †Peachella
 †Peachella brevispina
 †Peachella iddingsi
 †Peniculauris – report made of unidentified related form or using admittedly obsolete nomenclature
 †Peniculauris bassi
  †Pentamerus
 †Perditocardinia
 †Permophorus
 †Pernopecten
 †Perrinites
 †Perrinites hilli
 †Peruniscus
 †Petalaxis
 †Petalaxis allisonae – type locality for species
 †Petalaxis besti – type locality for species
 †Petalaxis exiguus – type locality for species
 †Petalaxis occidentalis
 †Petalaxis sutherlandi – type locality for species
 †Petrozium
 †Petrozium staufferi – type locality for species
 †Phillipsia
 †Phillipsia nosonensis – type locality for species
 †Pholidops
 †Phragmorthis
 †Phragmorthis buttsi – or unidentified comparable form
 †Phricodothyris
  †Phyllograptus
  †Plaesiomys
 †Plagiura
 †Plagiura cerops – or unidentified comparable form
 †Plagiura minor
  †Planolites
 †Plasmopora
 †Plasmopora follis – or unidentified comparable form
   †Platyceras
 †Plectatrypa
 †Plectorthis
 †Plectorthis mazourkaensis
 †Plectorthis patula
 †Poleumita
 †Poleumita octavia
 †Polidevcia
 †Polyplacus
 †Polyplacus kilmeri
 †Polypora
 †Porefieldia
 †Porefieldia robusta
 †Presbynileus
 †Productus
 †Productus keokuk
  †Proetus
 †Proexenocrinus
 †Proexenocrinus inyoensis
 †Progalerus – tentative report
 †Prosolarium
 †Protocalymene
 †Protocalymene mcallisteri
 †Protowentzelella – type locality for genus
 †Protowentzelella cystosa
 †Protowentzelella kunthi
 †Protowentzelella noinskyi
 †Protowentzelella shastensis – type locality for species
 †Protowentzelella variabilis – type locality for species
 †Proturritella
 †Proturritella historicum – or unidentified related form
 †Pseudocheirurus
 †Pseudochusenella
 †Pseudochusenella buttensis – type locality for species
 †Pseudochusenella concisa
 †Pseudochusenella hazzardi – type locality for species
 †Pseudocystophora
 †Pseudocystophora fryi – type locality for species
 †Pseudocystophora wilsoni – type locality for species
 †Pseudofusulina
 †Pseudofusulina accepta – type locality for species
 †Pseudofusulina acuta – type locality for species
 †Pseudofusulina amoena – type locality for species
 †Pseudofusulina ardua – type locality for species
 †Pseudofusulina attenuata – type locality for species
 †Pseudofusulina concisa – type locality for species
 †Pseudofusulina contracta – type locality for species
 †Pseudofusulina decora – type locality for species
 †Pseudofusulina distorta – type locality for species
 †Pseudofusulina elleryensis – type locality for species
 †Pseudofusulina eximia – type locality for species
 †Pseudofusulina extensa – type locality for species
 †Pseudofusulina juncea – type locality for species
 †Pseudofusulina laxa – type locality for species
 †Pseudofusulina meeki – type locality for species
 †Pseudofusulina minuta – type locality for species
 †Pseudofusulina modesta – type locality for species
 †Pseudofusulina monstrosa – type locality for species
 †Pseudofusulina plana – type locality for species
 †Pseudofusulina retusa – type locality for species
 †Pseudofusulina solita – type locality for species
 †Pseudofusulina soluta – type locality for species
 †Pseudofusulina spissa – type locality for species
 †Pseudofusulina tenuis – type locality for species
 †Pseudofusulina tenuitheca – type locality for species
 †Pseudofusulinella
 †Pseudofusulinella aculeata – type locality for species
 †Pseudofusulinella acuminata – type locality for species
 †Pseudofusulinella acuta – type locality for species
 †Pseudofusulinella alta – type locality for species
 †Pseudofusulinella antiqua – type locality for species
 †Pseudofusulinella bellula – type locality for species
 †Pseudofusulinella biconica – type locality for species
 †Pseudofusulinella decora – type locality for species
 †Pseudofusulinella delicata – type locality for species
 †Pseudofusulinella dunbari – type locality for species
 †Pseudofusulinella formosa – type locality for species
 †Pseudofusulinella fragilis – type locality for species
 †Pseudofusulinella fusiformis – type locality for species
 †Pseudofusulinella harbaughi – type locality for species
 †Pseudofusulinella meeki – type locality for species
 †Pseudofusulinella montis
 †Pseudofusulinella moorei – type locality for species
 †Pseudofusulinella munda – type locality for species
 †Pseudofusulinella nitida – type locality for species
 †Pseudofusulinella obtusa – type locality for species
 †Pseudofusulinella occidentalis
 †Pseudofusulinella opima – type locality for species
 †Pseudofusulinella parvula – type locality for species
 †Pseudofusulinella pinguis – type locality for species
 †Pseudofusulinella prima – type locality for species
 †Pseudofusulinella proba – type locality for species
 †Pseudofusulinella pulchella – type locality for species
 †Pseudofusulinella retusa – type locality for species
 †Pseudofusulinella rotunda – type locality for species
 †Pseudofusulinella sera – type locality for species
 †Pseudofusulinella simplex – type locality for species
 †Pseudofusulinella solida – type locality for species
 †Pseudofusulinella solita – type locality for species
 †Pseudofusulinella spicata – type locality for species
 †Pseudofusulinella splendens – type locality for species
 †Pseudofusulinella thompsoni – type locality for species
 †Pseudofusulinella tumida – type locality for species
 †Pseudofusulinella ventricosa – type locality for species
 †Pseudofusulinella venusta – type locality for species
 †Pseudofusulinella wheeleri – type locality for species
 †Pseudomera
 †Pseudomera barrandei – or unidentified comparable form
 †Pseudoschwagerina
 †Pseudoschwagerina arta
 †Pseudoschwagerina californica – type locality for species
 †Pseudoschwagerina gerontica – or unidentified comparable form
 †Pseudoschwagerina robusta
 †Pseudoschwagerina roeseleri
 †Pseudoschwagerina uddeni
 †Ptarmiganoides
 †Ptarmiganoides hexacantha
 †Ptarmiganoides propiqua – or unidentified comparable form
  †Pteridinium – tentative report
 †Ptychocaulus
 †Ptychocaulus rodneyi – type locality for species
 †Ptychopleurella
 †Ptychopleurella mediocostata – or unidentified comparable form
 †Ptychopleurella uniplicata – or unidentified related form
 †Ptyocephalus
 †Ptyocephalus declevita – or unidentified comparable form
 †Punctospirifer

R

 †Radiotrabeculopora
 †Radiotrabeculopora reticulata
 †Raphispira
 †Raphispira plena – or unidentified comparable form
 †Raymondaspis
 †Raymondaspis vespertina
 †Remopleurides
 †Remopleuridiella
 †Repinaella
 †Replicoskenidioides
 †Replicoskenidioides rodneygreggi
 †Reticulariina – tentative report
 †Reticulariina laxa
 †Rhabdomeson
 †Rhipidomella
 †Rhynchopora
 †Rhynchopora taylori
 †Rhysostrophia
 †Rhysostrophia nevadensis
 †Rhysostrophia occidentalis
 †Rigbyetia
 †Rigbyetia obconica
 †Rossoceras
 †Rotellomphalus
 †Rotellomphalus tardus – or unidentified comparable form
 †Ruedemannia
 †Ruedemannia lirata – or unidentified comparable form
 †Ruedemannoceras
 †Rugosochonetes
 †Rugosochonetes californicus
 †Rugosochonetes californucus
  †Rusophycus

S

 †Salopina
 †Salopina horseshoensis
 †Sandolasma
 †Sandolasma mckassoni – type locality for species
 †Sandolasma stonei
 †Scaphorthis
 †Schistometopus
 †Schizodus
 †Schizonema
 †Schizonema nisis – or unidentified comparable form
 †Schizophoria
 †Schizophoria bisinuata – or unidentified comparable form
 †Schizophoria compacta – or unidentified comparable form
 †Schubertella
 †Schubertella kingi
 †Schubertella minuta – type locality for species
 †Schubertella pusilla – type locality for species
 †Schuchertella
 †Schwagerina
 †Schwagerina aculeata
 †Schwagerina acuminata – type locality for species
 †Schwagerina amoena – type locality for species
 †Schwagerina arta – type locality for species
 †Schwagerina aspera – type locality for species
 †Schwagerina astricta – type locality for species
 †Schwagerina bassensis – type locality for species
 †Schwagerina bayhaensis – type locality for species
 †Schwagerina biconica – type locality for species
 †Schwagerina birklundensis – type locality for species
 †Schwagerina concinna – type locality for species
 †Schwagerina convexa
 †Schwagerina corpulenta – type locality for species
 †Schwagerina curta – type locality for species
 †Schwagerina cylindrica – type locality for species
 †Schwagerina davisi – or unidentified comparable form
 †Schwagerina demissa – type locality for species
 †Schwagerina elkoensis – or unidentified comparable form
 †Schwagerina eximia – type locality for species
 †Schwagerina fiski – type locality for species
 †Schwagerina harbaughi – type locality for species
 †Schwagerina humilis – type locality for species
 †Schwagerina juncea – type locality for species
 †Schwagerina klamathensis – type locality for species
 †Schwagerina laudoni – type locality for species
 †Schwagerina longissimoidea
 †Schwagerina mccloudensis – type locality for species
 †Schwagerina menziesi – or unidentified comparable form
 †Schwagerina modica
 †Schwagerina moorei – type locality for species
 †Schwagerina providens
 †Schwagerina providnes
 †Schwagerina pseudoprinceps – type locality for species
 †Schwagerina pugunculus – or unidentified comparable form
 †Schwagerina pulchella – type locality for species
 †Schwagerina remissa – type locality for species
 †Schwagerina rotunda – type locality for species
 †Schwagerina schencki – type locality for species
 †Schwagerina soluta – type locality for species
 †Schwagerina spicata – type locality for species
 †Schwagerina turgida – type locality for species
 †Schwagerina ventricosa – type locality for species
 †Schwagerina vervillei
 †Schwagerina wellsensis – or unidentified comparable form
 †Schwagerina wheeleri – type locality for species
 †Scolithes
 †Semicostella
 †Septospirifer – tentative report
 †Setigerites
 †Shamovella
 †Shastalasma
 †Shastalasma coogani – type locality for species
 †Shastalasma gavini – type locality for species
 †Shastalasma woodi – type locality for species
 †Shastaphyllum – type locality for genus
 †Shastaphyllum schucherti – type locality for species
 †Sigmelasma – type locality for genus
 †Sigmelasma pantherae – type locality for species
 †Siskiyouspira – type locality for genus
 †Siskiyouspira vostokovae – type locality for species
 †Skenidioides
 †Skenidioides glindmeyeri – type locality for species
 †Skenidioides mulifarius
 †Skenidioides multifarius
 †Skinnerella
 †Skinnerella davydovi – type locality for species
 †Skinnerella hexagona – type locality for species
 †Skinnerella mcallisteri – type locality for species
 †Spinuliplica
 †Spinulothele
  †Spirifer
 †Spirifer brazerianus
 †Spiriferella
 †Spiriferellina
  †Spiriferina – tentative report
 †Squamularia – report made of unidentified related form or using admittedly obsolete nomenclature
 †Stacheoceras
 †Stacheoceras antiquum – or unidentified related form
 †Stacheoceras gordoni – type locality for species
 †Stearoceras
 †Stearoceras phosphoriense – or unidentified related form
 †Stenoloron – tentative report
 †Stenoloron fasciata – or unidentified related form
 †Stenoscisma
 †Stenoscisma venustum
 †Stereostylus
 †Stereostylus bollibokkensis – type locality for species
 †Stewartina
 †Stewartina convexa
 †Stewartina magnifica – type locality for species
 †Stewartina multispira
 †Stewartina texana
 †Stewartina uber
 †Stewartina ultimata – type locality for species
 †Straparollus
 †Streblochondria
 †Streblopteria
 †Streptelasma
 †Streptosolen
 †Striatifera
 †Striatopora – tentative report
 †Striatopora gwenensis – or unidentified comparable form
 †Stricklandia – tentative report
 †Strigigenalis
 †Stylonema
 †Stylonema potens – or unidentified comparable form
 †Swantonia
  †Swartpuntia – or unidentified comparable form
 †Symphysurina
 †Syringaxon
  †Syringopora
 †Syspacephalus
 †Syspacephalus granulosus – tentative report
 †Syspacephalus obscurus
 †Syspacephalus variosus – type locality for species

T

 †Taphrhelminthopsis
 †Taphrhelminthopsis nelsoni
 †Taphrorthis – tentative report
 †Temnodiscus – tentative report
 †Temnodiscus euryomphalus
 †Thairoplax
 †Thairoplax merriami – type locality for species
 †Thamniscus – report made of unidentified related form or using admittedly obsolete nomenclature
 †Thamnosia
 †Thamnosia arctica
 †Thompsonella
 †Thompsonella cylindrica – type locality for species
 †Thompsonella rugosa – type locality for species
 †Timaniella
 †Timaniella pseudocamerata
 †Tonopahella – type locality for genus
 †Tonopahella goldfieldensis – type locality for species
 †Tonopahella walcotti
 †Torynifer
 †Trematospira
 †Trepospira
  †Trinodus
 †Trinodus clusus – or unidentified comparable form
 †Triticites
 †Triticites bensonensis
 †Triticites brevis – type locality for species
 †Triticites burgessae – or unidentified comparable form
 †Triticites buttensis
 †Triticites californicus
 †Triticites cellamagnus
 †Triticites elegantoides
 †Triticites gigantocellus
 †Triticites hermanni – type locality for species
 †Triticites invenustus – type locality for species
 †Triticites muddiensis
 †Triticites mulleri – type locality for species
 †Triticites occidentalis – type locality for species
 †Triticites schencki – type locality for species
 †Triticites tumentis – type locality for species
 †Triticites usitatus – type locality for species
 †Triticites ventricosus – or unidentified related form
 †Triticites viribus – type locality for species
 †Trocholites – tentative report
 †Trochonema
 †Trochonema liljevalli – type locality for species
 †Trochonemella – tentative report
 †Trochonemella mikulici – type locality for species
 †Tschussovskenia
 †Tschussovskenia connorsensis

U

 †Unispirifer

V

 †Valcourea
 †Valcourea plana – or unidentified comparable form
 †Verneuilia
 †Volborthella
 †Volborthella tenuis
 †Volocephalina
 †Volocephalina connexa
 †Volocephalina contracta

W

 †Waagenoconcha – tentative report
 †Waagenophyllum
 †Waagenophyllum klamathensis – type locality for species
  †Wanneria
 †Waucobella
 †Waucobella nelsoni
 †Wellerella
 †Wellerella hemiplicata – or unidentified comparable form
 †Wellerella rotunda – or unidentified comparable form
 †Wenkchemnia
 †Wenkchemnia spinicollus – tentative report
 †Wenkchemnia sulcata
 †Westgardia
 †Westgardia gigantea – type locality for species
 †Wexolina – type locality for genus
 †Wexolina tombstonensis – type locality for species
 †Whitfieldella – tentative report
 †Wilsonastraea – type locality for genus
 †Wilsonastraea fluvius – type locality for species
 †Wilsonastraea parva – type locality for species
 †Wilsonastraea smithi – type locality for species
 †Wintunastraea – type locality for genus
 †Wintunastraea stanleyi – type locality for species
 †Wyattia

X

  †Xenodiscus
 †Xenodiscus carbonarius – or unidentified related form
 †Xenostegium
 †Xestotrema
 †Xestotrema pulchrum

Y

 †Yakovlevia
 †Yakovlevia californica – type locality for species

Z

 †Zacanthoides
 †Zacanthopsis
 †Zelophyllum

References
 

Paleozoic
Life
California